Torreya nucifera is a slow-growing, coniferous tree native to southern Japan and to South Korea's Jeju Island. It is also called  Japanese torreya or Japanese nutmeg-yew.

Description

It grows to 15–25 m tall with a trunk up to 1.5 m diameter. The leaves are evergreen, needle-like, 2–3 cm long and 3 mm broad, with a sharply spined tip and two whitish stomatal bands on the underside; they are spirally arranged, but twisted at the base to lie horizontally either side of the stem. It is subdioecious, with individual trees producing either mostly male or mostly female cones, but usually with at least some cones of the other sex present. The male cones are globular, 5–6 mm diameter, in a double row along the underside of a shoot. The female cones are borne in clusters of three to eight together, maturing in 18–20 months to a single seed surrounded by a fleshy layer, 2 cm long and 1.5 cm broad.

Uses
Its wood is prized for the construction of Go boards and Shogi boards because of its beautiful yellow-gold color, fine and uniform ring texture, and the sonic quality of the click of a stone on its surface. The tree is protected in Japan because of its scarcity due to past overcutting. Ancient kaya trees have to die before they can be harvested to make thick Go boards, which makes them extremely expensive; the finest ones can cost over $19,000. Shin-kaya ("new kaya" in Japanese), imitation kaya, is usually Alaskan, Tibetan or Siberian white spruce, which has become somewhat popular for cheaper equipment due to the scarcity of kaya trees. Go bowls can also be made of kaya, though this is less common.

In Japanese esoteric Buddhism like Shingon, the leaves of the tree as well as the oil extracted have ritual uses. The leaves of the tree represent flowers and the oil from the tree is burnt as a lamp during a long meditation practice known as Morning Star meditation.

The seeds are edible, and also pressed for their vegetable oil content.

Other than that, the trees can have cultural and historic significance to people living around them, such as the Japanese Torreya of Samin-ri.

Famous trees 

An old tree is located close to the Nishinomaru-enokida Gate at Nagoya Castle. Its height is 16 metres and it is eight metres at the base. Over 600 years old, the tree was already there when the castle was constructed. It is the only government-designated natural monument in Nagoya. The tree regained its viability despite damage from air raids in 1945. Tokugawa Yoshinao, the first feudal lord of Owari, and thus the castle, is said to have decorated his dinner tray with torreya nuts from this tree before going into battle in Osaka, and later for New Year's celebrations.

References

External links
Arboretum de Villardebelle - Torreya nucifera
Gardens of the world: Botanischer Garten der Universität Leipzig - Mature Specimin
Kaya on Senseis, the Go Wiki

nucifera
Trees of Japan
Japanese woods
Taxa named by Carl Linnaeus
Edible nuts and seeds
Go equipment
Trees of Korea